"Splitrmx12" is a vinyl-only promotional recording by Autechre, released 1 November 1999 by Warp Records and limited to 3000 copies.

The A-side is a mashup of the tracks "Weissensee" and "Im Glück" by Neu!, from the 1972 self-titled album Neu!. It was previously released on the tribute album A Homage to Neu! (1998).

It remains unclear whether "Bic" or "Bic?" is the name of an existing group.

Track listing

References

External links

 AUTECHRE • SPLITRMX12 – official release page.
 Autechre: Splitrmx12 review in NME

1999 EPs
Autechre EPs
Remix EPs
Warp (record label) remix albums
Warp (record label) singles